Łukasz Derbich  (born 23 October 1983 in Pleszew) is a Polish former professional footballer who played as a defender.

Career

Club
He was released from Cracovia on 16 June 2011.

In July 2011, he joined Sandecja Nowy Sącz on a one-year contract.

References

External links
 

1983 births
Living people
People from Pleszew
Sportspeople from Greater Poland Voivodeship
Polish footballers
Association football defenders
Tur Turek players
MKS Cracovia (football) players
Ruch Chorzów players
Sandecja Nowy Sącz players
Olimpia Elbląg players
Radomiak Radom players
Pelikan Łowicz players
Limanovia Limanowa players
FC Einheit Rudolstadt players
Górnik Konin players
Ekstraklasa players
I liga players
II liga players
III liga players
IV liga players
Oberliga (football) players
Polish expatriate footballers
Expatriate footballers in Germany
Polish expatriate sportspeople in Germany